The 2020 Florida State Seminoles women's soccer team represented Florida State University during the 2020 NCAA Division I women's soccer season. It was the 26th season of the university fielding a program. The Seminoles were led by 16th year head coach Mark Krikorian.

Due to the COVID-19 pandemic, the ACC played a reduced schedule in 2020 and the NCAA Tournament was postponed to 2021.

The Seminoles finished the fall season 11–0–0, 8–0–0 in ACC play, to finish in first place.  As the first seed in the ACC Tournament, they defeated Notre Dame, Duke, and finally North Carolina to claim the championship. The Seminoles did not play any additional games in the spring season and entered the NCAA Tournament as the ACC's automatic qualifier because they won the ACC Tournament.  They were selected as the first overall seed in the NCAA Tournament and defeated Milwaukee in the Second Round and Penn State in the Third Round.  They advanced past Duke in the Quarterfinals and Virginia in the Semifinals on penalty shootouts.  However, their shootout luck ran out in the Finals, where they fell to Santa Clara to end their season. Jaelin Howell went on to win the Herman Trophy.

Previous season 

The Seminoles finished the season 18–6–0, 8–2–0 in ACC play, to finish in second place.  As the second seed in the ACC Tournament, they defeated Clemson in the first round before losing in overtime to Virginia in the semifinals.  They received an at-large bid to the NCAA Tournament where they defeated South Alabama, Brown, and USF, before losing to UCLA in the quarterfinals.

Squad

Roster 

Source:

Team management 

Source:

Schedule

Source:

|-
!colspan=7 style=""| ACC Regular season

|-
!colspan=7 style=""| ACC Tournament

|-
!colspan=7 style=""| NCAA Tournament

Rankings

Fall 2020

Spring 2021

References 

Florida State
2020 in sports in Florida
Florida State
Florida State Seminoles women's soccer seasons